K. S. Sethumadhavan (15 May 1931 – 24 December 2021) was an Indian film director and screenwriter who worked predominantly in Malayalam cinema. He also directed films in Hindi, Tamil and Telugu.

Since the early 1960s, he directed over 60 movies including many landmark films in the Malayalam film history such as Odayil Ninnu, Yakshi, Kadalpalam, Achanum Bappayum, Ara Nazhika Neram, Panitheeratha Veedu, Anubhavangal Palichakal, Punarjanmam and Oppol.

He won numerous awards including ten National Film Awards and nine Kerala State Film Awards including four for Best Direction. In 2009, he was awarded the J. C. Daniel Award, Government of Kerala's highest honour for contributions to the Malayalam cinema.

Life and career
K. S. Sethumadhavan was born to Subrahmanyam and Lakshmiyamma at Palghat, Madras Presidency, British India on 15 May 1931. He had three sisters and one brother. His childhood was spent in Palakkad and in North Arcot, Tamil Nadu. He completed his degree in biology from Government Victoria College, Palakkad. He debuted in the film industry as the Assistant Director to K. Ramnath. He later assisted directors L. V. Prasad, A. S. A. Swamy, Sunder Rao and Nandakarni.

He debuted as an independent film director with Veeravijaya, a Sinhalese film in 1960. His first Malayalam film was Gnana Sundari, produced by T. E. Vasudevan under the banner of Associates Pictures based on a short story by Muttathu Varkey. He then went on to direct over 60 films including noted films Odayil Ninnu, Daaham, Sthanarthi Saramma, Koottukudumbam, Vazhve Mayam, Ara Nazhika Neram, Anubhavangal Palichakal, Karakanakkadal, Achanum Bappayum, Punarjanmam, Chattakkari, Oppol, Marupakkam, Kannada Movie Manini.

His film Achanum Bappayum won the Nargis Dutt Award for Best Feature Film on National Integration, a part of National Film Awards, in 1973. His Tamil film Marupakkam won the National Film Award for Best Feature Film in 1991. Thus it became the first Tamil film to win the award, the feat was repeated by Kanchivaram in 2007.

In 1996, his Telugu film Stri won the National Film Award for Best Feature Film in Telugu. He won the Kerala State Film Award for Best Director 4 times: for films Ara Nazhika Neram (1970), Karakanakkadal (1971), Pani Theeratha Veedu (1972) and Oppol (1980). He was the jury member for the National Film Awards in 1975 and 1980. In 1982, he was the chairman of the jury for the Kerala State Film Awards. He was the chairman of the National Film Awards jury in 2002, and was awarded the J. C. Daniel Award for the year 2009, honouring his achievements and contribution to Malayalam Cinema. In 2011, he was honoured with the Chalachitra Ratnam Award by the Kerala Film Critics Association.

His son Santosh Sethumadhavan is also a filmmaker who remade the 1974 cult classic Chattakkari in 2012 but failed to create any impact, owing to the remake being overshadowed by the original film.

Sethumadhavan died at his home in Chennai on 24 December 2021, at the age of 90.

Awards

 Filmfare Awards South
 1972 – Filmfare  Award for Best Director - Malayalam : Punarjanmam
 1973 – Filmfare Best Director Award (Malayalam) : Pani Theeratha Veedu
 1974 – Filmfare Best Director Award (Malayalam) : Chattakari
 1980 – Filmfare Best Director Award (Malayalam) : Oppol

 Kerala State Film Awards
 1970 – Best Director  : Aranazhika Neram
 1971 – Best Director  : Karakanakadal
 1971 – Third Best Film: Karakanakadal
 1972 – Best Director  : Panitheeratha Veedu
 1972 – Best Film: Pani Theeratha Veedu
 1974 – Second Best Film: Chattakari
 1980 – Best Director  : Oppol
 1980 – Best Film: Oppol
 2009 – J. C. Daniel Award Nandi Awards
 1995 – Nandi Special Jury Award for Stri National Film Awards
 1965 – Best Feature Film in Malayalam for Odayil Ninnu 1969 – Best Feature Film in Malayalam for Adimakal 1971 – Best Feature Film in Malayalam for Karakanakadal 1972 – Best Film on National Integration for Achanum Bappayum 1972 – Best Feature Film in Malayalam for Panitheeratha Veedu 1980 – Second Best Feature Film for Oppol 1990 – Best Feature Film for Marupakkam 1990 – Best Screenplay for Marupakkam 
 1994 – Best Feature Film in Tamil for Nammavar 1995 – Best Feature Film in Telugu for StriSelected filmography

 Stri (1995) - Telugu
 Nammavar (1994) - Tamil
 Marupakkam (1991) - Tamil
 Venal Kinavukal (1991)
 Sunil Vayassu 20 (1986)
 Avidathepole Ivideyum (1985)
 Aarorumariyathe (1984)
 Ariyatha Veethikal (1984)
 Nijangal (1982) - Tamil
 Oppol (1980)
 Maanini (1979) - Kannada
 Nakshathrangale Kaaval (1978)
 Yehi Hai Zindagi (1977) - Hindi
 Amme Anupame (1977)
 Ormakal Marikkumo (1977)
 Priyamvada (1976)
 Julie (1975) - Hindi
 Chuvanna Sandhyakal (1975)
 Makkal (1975)
 Naalai Namadhe (1975) - Tamil
 Chattakari (1974)
 Jeevikkan Marannu Poya Sthree (1974)
 Kanyakumari (1974)
 Azhakulla Saleena (1973)
 Chukku (1973)
 Kaliyugam (1973)
 Panitheeratha Veedu (1973)
 Achanum Bappayum (1972)
 Aadhyathe Katha (1972)
 Devi (1972)
 Punarjanmam (1972)
 Anubhavangal Paalichakal (1971)
 Inqulab Zindabbad (1971)
 Karakanakadal (1971)
 Line Bus (1971)
 Oru Penninte Katha (1971)
 Thettu (1971)
 Amma Enna Stree (1970)
 Ara Nazhika Neram (1970)
 Kalpana (1970)
 Kuttavali (1970)
 Mindapennu (1970)
 Vazhve Mayam (1970)
 Kalyaana Oorvalam (1970) - Tamil
 Adimakal (1969)
 Kadalpalam (1969)
 Kootu Kudumbam (1969)
 Bharyamar Sookshikkuka (1968)
 Paal Manam (1968) - Tamil
 Thokkukal Katha Parayunnu (1968)
 Yakshi (1968)
 Kottayam Kolacase (1967)
 Naadan Pennu (1967)
 Ollathu Mathi (1967)
 Archana (1966)
 Rowdy (1966)
 Sthanarthy Saramma (1966)
 Daaham (1965)
 Odeyil Ninnu (1965)
 Anna (1964)
 Manavatty (1964)
 Omanakuttan (1964)
 Nithya Kanyaka (1963)
 Susheela (1963)
 Kannum Karalum (1962)
 Jnana Sundari'' (1961)

References

 'Cinema of Malayalam' profile

External links
 

1931 births
2021 deaths
Best Original Screenplay National Film Award winners
Directors who won the Best Feature Film National Film Award
Directors who won the Best Film on National Integration National Film Award
J. C. Daniel Award winners
Indian male screenwriters
Artists from Palakkad
Malayali people
Malayalam film directors
Telugu film directors
Tamil film directors
Odia film directors
Hindi-language film directors
Government Victoria College, Palakkad alumni
Kerala State Film Award winners
Filmfare Awards South winners
20th-century Indian film directors
Film directors from Kerala
Screenwriters from Kerala
20th-century Indian dramatists and playwrights
Malayalam screenwriters
20th-century Indian male writers